Julian Owusu-Bekoe (born 10 May 1989 in Tooting) is an English-born Ghanaian entrepreneur, speaker and former football player.

Education
Julian attended St.Boniface Primary school, Richmond College and Wimbledon College before attending London School of Business and Management  in 2014 for a BSc in Business and Management.

Career
He began his career at Predators F.C. as a youngster, in 2006 he joined Park View, and won there the Young Player of the Year Award for 2007. He was given a two-week trial at SBV Excelsior on 20 January 2007 which was later extended by a further month.

In 2008, he returned to Ghana and signed a one-year contract with Eleven Wise, in the summer of 2009 he signed for English Isthmian League Division One South side, Merstham. In December 2010, Owusu-Bekoe signed a three-year contract with Glo Premier League side Berekum Chelsea where he won his first league title with the Berekum Based club. His contract was cancelled at the end of the season.

On 4 August 2011, Owusu joined Conference National side Hayes & Yeading United. He subsequently signed for Burnham before rejoining Hayes & Yeading in January 2012.

In 2014, however, he signed for Basingstoke Town. In 2015, Julian became the first Student President at London School of Business and Management where he led the student body till the summer of 2017.

He is the co-founder of the London/Accra-based startup, Zuberi.

International 
Owusu-Bekoe joined the Ghana U17 national team camp in mid-October 2006. He scored two goals in two friendly matches—with Division One side Fairpoint F.C. and Mighty Jets.

Honours 
2007: Young Player of the Year Award

References 

1989 births
Living people
Ghanaian footballers
Sekondi Wise Fighters players
Merstham F.C. players
Berekum Chelsea F.C. players
Hayes & Yeading United F.C. players
Burnham F.C. players
Basingstoke Town F.C. players
National League (English football) players
Association football forwards